Les Martys is a commune in the Aude department in southern France.

It is located in the Montagne Noire on highway D 118 between Mazamet and Carcassonne.

Population

See also
Communes of the Aude department

References

Martys
Aude communes articles needing translation from French Wikipedia